Kentucky is a U.S. state.

Kentucky may also refer the Kentucky River, which flows through that state, or to:

Places 
 Kentucky in Africa, a former settler colony of ex-slaves in West Africa
 Kentucky, New South Wales, Australia
 Kentucky Camp, Arizona
 Kentucky, Michigan, Munising Township, Michigan
 Kentucky County, Virginia
 Kentucky Township, Jefferson County, Kansas
 Kentucky Home, a historic home in Miami, Florida

Other 
 Kentucky (film), a 1938 film
 Kentucky (horse), an American Thoroughbred racehorse 
 Kentucky Wildcats, the intercollegiate athletic teams of the University of Kentucky
 USS Kentucky, the name of several ships
 Kentucky Rifle (or long rifle), a type of old, muzzle loaded rifles
 Kentucky (album), a 2016 album by Black Stone Cherry
 Kentucky (Panopticon album), a 2012 album by Panopticon
 "Kentucky", a song by Karl Davis from Tragic Songs of Life

See also